Lindiwe is a South African given name that may refer to
Lindiwe Hendricks (born 1957), South African politician 
Brenda Lindiwe Mabaso-Chipeio (born 1969), South African international trade expert
Lindiwe Mabuza (1938–2021), South African politician, diplomat, poet, academic, journalist, and cultural activist
Lindiwe Magwede (born 1991), Zimbabwean association football goalkeeper
Lindiwe Majele Sibanda, Zimbabwean agricultural researcher 
Lindiwe Mazibuko (born 1980), South African politician and musician 
Lindiwe Sisulu (born 1954), South African politician
Lindiwe Zulu, South Africa's Minister of Small Business Development